Liberty County is a county in the U.S. state of Georgia. As of the 2020 census, the population is 65,256. The county seat is Hinesville.

Liberty County is part of the Hinesville, Georgia Metropolitan Statistical Area, which is also included in the Savannah-Hinesville-Statesboro, Georgia Combined Statistical Area.

History
Liberty County was established in 1777. It is named for the American ideal of liberty. Sunbury was first designated the county seat in 1784. In 1797, the seat was transferred to Riceboro, and in 1837 it was transferred again to Hinesville.

1922 lynching 

On July 1, 1922, James Harvey and Joe Jordan, two African American men, were lynched by a mob of about 50 people in Liberty County during an escort by police from Jesup, Georgia to a jail in Savannah, Georgia. The event drew condemnation from both the local black community and from several prominent white citizens, with the preacher at Midway Methodist Church denouncing the acts and publishing a widely circulated letter condemning the Wayne County officials of being complicit in the murders. The incident prompted an investigation by the NAACP, and in total, 22 men were indicted, with four being convicted.

Geography

The eastern and southern portion of Liberty County is located in the Ogeechee Coastal sub-basin of the Ogeechee River basin. The northern and western portion of the county is located in the Canoochee River sub-basin of the Ogeechee River basin.

Major highways

  Interstate 95
  U.S. Route 17
  U.S. Route 84
  State Route 25
  State Route 38
  State Route 38 Connector
  State Route 119
  State Route 144
  State Route 196
  State Route 405 (unsigned designation for I-95)

Adjacent counties
 Chatham County - northeast
 Bryan County - north
 McIntosh County - south
 Long County - west
 Evans County - northwest
 Tattnall County - northwest

Demographics

2000 census
At the 2000 census there were 61,610 people, 19,383 households, and 15,138 families living in the county. There were 21,977 housing units at an average density of 42 per square mile (16/km2). The racial makeup of the county was 46.64% White, 42.84% Black or African American, 0.52% Native American, 1.76% Asian, 0.43% Pacific Islander, 4.43% from other races, and 3.37% from two or more races.  8.15% of the population were Hispanic or Latino of any race.
According to 2005 Census Estimates Liberty County had a population that was 44.5% African-American, 44.4% Non-Hispanic white, 7.2% Latino, 3.1% non-Hispanics who reported multiple races, 1.9% Asian and 0.5% of both Native Americans and Pacific Islanders.

Of the 19,383 households 50.50% had children under the age of 18 living with them, 59.60% were married couples living together, 14.80% had a female householder with no husband present, and 21.90% were non-families. 16.60% of households were one person and 3.20% were one person aged 65 or older.  The average household size was 2.93 and the average family size was 3.29.

The age distribution was 32.00% under the age of 18, 17.90% from 18 to 24, 33.90% from 25 to 44, 12.20% from 45 to 64, and 3.90% 65 or older.  The median age was 25 years. For every 100 females, there were 111.30 males.  For every 100 females age 18 and over, there were 115.10 males.

The median household income was $33,477 and the median family income  was $35,031. Males had a median income of $25,305 versus $20,765 for females. The per capita income for the county was $13,855.  About 13.50% of families and 15.00% of the population were below the poverty line, including 19.20% of those under age 18 and 19.90% of those age 65 or over.

2010 census
At the 2010 census, there were 63,453 people, 22,155 households, and 16,566 families living in the county. The racial makeup of the county was 47.1% white, 42.2% black or African American, 2.0% Asian, 0.6% Pacific islander, 0.6% American Indian, 2.9% from other races, and 4.7% from two or more races. Those of Hispanic or Latino origin made up 9.7% of the population. In terms of ancestry, 8.8% were German, 6.9% were Irish, and 6.0% were American.

Of the 22,155 households, 45.9% had children under the age of 18 living with them, 49.0% were married couples living together, 21.5% had a female householder with no husband present, 25.2% were non-families, and 20.7% of households were made up of individuals. The average household size was 2.75 and the average family size was 3.18. The median age was 27.9 years.

The median household income was $42,674 and the median family income  was $46,818. Males had a median income of $35,881 versus $31,159 for females. The per capita income for the county was $18,662. About 15.0% of families and 17.8% of the population were below the poverty line, including 26.2% of those under age 18 and 13.4% of those age 65 or over.

2020 census

As of the 2020 United States census, there were 65,256 people, 23,485 households, and 16,657 families residing in the county.

Communities

Cities
 Allenhurst
 Flemington
 Gumbranch
 Hinesville (county seat)
 Midway
 Riceboro
 Walthourville

Census-designated place
 Fort Stewart

Unincorporated communities
 Sunbury
Fleming
Limerick
McIntosh
Seabrook

Education 

Liberty County School District  is the designated school district for grades K-12 for the county, except parts in Fort Stewart. Fort Stewart has the Department of Defense Education Activity (DoDEA) as its local school district, for the elementary level. Students at the secondary level on Fort Stewart attend public schools operated by county school districts.

The Liberty district operates public schools, including the comprehensive high school Liberty County High School and the Bradwell Institute, as well as its educative middle schools Midway Middle School, Lewis Frasier Middle School, and Snelson-Golden Middle School.

They also provide a career academy, Liberty College & Career Academy (LCCA), for extra academics where students study for a profession they could seek out in the future.

In the media 
The 2014 independent film, A Promise, was filmed in Liberty County.

Politics

Gallery

See also

 National Register of Historic Places listings in Liberty County, Georgia
List of counties in Georgia

References
General

Specific
 Georgia Encyclopedia entry for Liberty County, Georgia

 
Georgia (U.S. state) counties
1777 establishments in Georgia (U.S. state)
Populated places established in 1777
Hinesville metropolitan area
Majority-minority counties in Georgia